is a Japanese voice actor. He played several notable roles in Japanese manga and anime television series, including Kenshiro in Fist of the North Star, Ryo Saeba in City Hunter and Shutaro Mendo in Urusei Yatsura. In mecha anime, he voiced Ryoma Nagare in Getter Robo, Akira Hibiki in Brave Raideen, Sanshirō Tsuwabuki in Gaiking, Roy Focker in The Super Dimension Fortress Macross, and Sincline in Beast King GoLion.

Biography

Early life 
Kamiya was born in Yokohama. He graduated from Tokyo Metropolitan Shiba Commercial High School and became a freelancer after being affiliated with Theatre Echo, Aoni Production, Production Baobab, Tokyo Actor's Consumer's Cooperative Society and Ups. Kamiya then founded Saeba Shoji, a talent agency.

Background 
His father ran a furniture manufacturing factory, but it suddenly closed and his parents divorced. After that, Kamiya's mother raised him and his brother. As a result of his mother's search for work, he attended many schools over the years, from Aoki Elementary School in Yokohama to Higashidai Elementary School in Tsurumi and Aioi elementary school in Ota-ku, Tokyo. The presence of actor Shoichi Ozawa as the eldest of Aioi Ko led Kamiya on the road to drama.

After that, he entered the Tokyo Metropolitan Tateshiba Commercial High School via Misono Junior High School. Kamiya's friend invited him to join the drama club, saying that, "I think Kamiya has a good voice." At that time, it was more difficult to become an actor than previously and difficult to advance in the field. Kamiya told his mother, "I want to be an actor. I will do my best because it is the path I chose myself." Later, he recalled, "If [I] were [my] mother, [I] might have stopped crying." After graduating from high school, he joined the amateur theater company Kanza in Yokohama.

Activities as a voice actor 
In 1970, Kamiya debuted as an anime voice actor playing the role of Senkichi in the TV anime Mahō no Mako-chan during the Theatre Echo study period. The first regular role was Sasuke Yashima in Akakichi no Eleven. He appeared as Koichi Furumi in Babel II, and also learned his trademark "scream" with this work. Since then, he has been in charge of several prominent roles chiefly in robot animation works, such as Ryoma Nagare in Getter Robo. He was called "Screaming Kamiya" because he kept screaming his special moves. One of the notable voice actors in the Super Robot Wars video game series, Kamiya himself appeared on TV commercials when Super Robot Wars F was released.

In the 1980s, he appeared in several animated manga series serialised in Weekly Shōnen Jump. He appeared in Kinnikuman, Fist of the North Star, and City Hunter, and was also known as one of the voice actors familiar with Jump anime. Since many of these Shōnen Jump anime have become long-running series, the works that appeared during this time are often introduced as Akira Kamiya's masterpiece.

He often narrates commercials and variety shows, including the hero show commercial of Tokyo Dome City Attractions (former Korakuen Yuenchi), which is primarily broadcast on the Super Sentai series frame, and has been in charge of narration for over 20 years since 1986.

He became the recipient of Animage's Grand Prix prize.

On January 9, 2017, the program was broadcast on TV Asahi and was ranked 22nd in "200 Popular Voice Actors Seriously Selected! Voice Actor General Election! 3 Hours SP".

Other activities 
Kamiya was initially a bass player with the popular voice actor's musical group Slapstick, which was active in the 1970s and 1980s. However, he expressed his concern that his schedule was busy, and the performance activities he had enjoyed as an amateur band in a harmonious manner would be produced as professional singer activities, and he offered to withdraw.

He has worked as a radio personality for All Night Nippon. He is the first regular personality as a voice actor. In the same program, he made a corner called "Guinness!". He knew what he was doing at MBS Young Town, and he still has friends.

In 1979, he played personality with Mitsuko Horie on a Sunday afternoon radio program called "Mitsuko and Akira's Deadly Handgun," and released a duet single, "Oh! Sunday Youth is Sunday."

In addition to working as a singer in Purin Purin Monogatari and Fist of the North Star, he also performed in the early 1980s with Kazuyuki Sogabe, Ryūsei Nakao and Naoya Uchida.

In the aftermath of the Great Hanshin-Awaji Earthquake in 1995, he formed a charity unit "WITH YOU". He was also active in the Fureai Concert.

Filmography

Animation

Films

Video games

Live-action

Drama CD

Other dubbing

Honors 
 Anime Grand Prix: Most Popular Voice Actor of the Year (11 times): 1979–1981, 1983–1985, 1987–1990

References

External links 
 Official blog 
 Official agency profile 
 
 
 
 

1946 births
Living people
Aoni Production voice actors
Japanese male singers
Japanese male video game actors
Japanese male voice actors
Male voice actors from Yokohama
Production Baobab voice actors
20th-century Japanese male actors
21st-century Japanese male actors